Aristoteles Iraklis Philippidis (1915–1985) was a scholar in the field of applied mechanics, and made contributions to the mechanics of materials, especially to the theory of plasticity.

He was born in Smyrna. He graduated from the Praktikon Lykeum Athens in 1932 and got Diploma Engineering degree from the National Technical University of Athens. He went to Technical University of Berlin in 1938 and made his doctoral study under the supervision of Prof. Georg Hamel. In 1939, he got his doctor degree.

He then conducted post-doctoral research at University of Munich in 1940 and at Technical University of Munich from 1940 to 1945.

In 1947, he went to United States and taught at the California Institute of Technology and at Stanford University. Later he became a professor at Yale University, until his death.

He was the founder and co-editor of Acta Mechanica.

References

20th-century American engineers
Greek engineers
Greek emigrants to the United States
Structural engineers
1915 births
1985 deaths
National Technical University of Athens alumni
Technical University of Berlin alumni
Technical University of Munich alumni
Yale University faculty
Smyrniote Greeks
Emigrants from the Ottoman Empire to Greece